Lal Thanzara is an Indian politician who was the Mizoram MLA for Aizawl North 3 (Vidhan Sabha constituency). He is presently the President of Mizoram Football Association. His name came in office for profit scam. He resigned from Cabinet for allegedly holding 21.6 per cent share in Sunshine Overseas, a construction company, which was getting government contracts. He won Aizawl North 3 by winning 6,175 of the 10,916 votes polled. He is the brother of the former Chief Minister of Mizoram Lal Thanhawla. Touted by many as the Chief Minister in waiting, he was the Cabinet Minister for Health & Family Welfare, Information & Communication Technology, Information & Public Relations and assisted his brother the Chief Minister in Public Works Department and Power and Electricity Department in Government of Mizoram till 2018 when the General Assembly Elections were held and lost his seat in Aizawl North 3 to C. Lalmuanpuia from MNF party.

References

External links
 LAL THANZARA Profile from My Neta

Year of birth missing (living people)
Living people
Indian National Congress politicians from Mizoram
People from Aizawl
Mizoram MLAs 2008–2013
Mizoram MLAs 2013–2018
Indian football executives